Khaooohs is the second album by band Pan.Thy.Monium. It was released in 1993.

Track listing
"I Månens Sken Dog En Skugga" – 1:50
"Under Ytan" – 3:56
"Jag & Vem" – 5:54
"Lava" – 7:37
"Lömska Försåt" - 6:55
"I Vindens Våld" - 0:50
"Klieveage" - 2:48
"Ekkhoeece III" - 0:44
"Khaooohs I" - 4:47
"Utsikt" - 8:12
"Khaooohs II" - 0:40

Personnel
Derelict aka Robert "Robban" Karlsson - vocals 
Winter aka Benny Larsson - drums, percussion and violin 
Day DiSyraah aka Dan Swanö - bass, keyboards and effects   
Mourning aka Robert Ivarsson - rhythm guitars  
Äag aka Tom Nouga aka Dag Swanö - lead guitars, organ and baritone saxophone

Production
All tracks written by Day DiSyraah, Winter and Mourning
Vocal parts written by Derelict
Lead guitar and saxophone parts written by Aag
Lyrics by Dr. Dark except "Klieveage" & "Ekkhoeece" by Pan-Thy-Monium
"Khaoohs" by Derelict
"I Månens Sken Dog En Skugga" and "I Vindens Våld" written and performed by Day DiSyraah
"Khaoohs II" written and performed by Winter, Day DiSyraah and Derelict
Produced by Pan-Thy-Monium & Raagoonshinnaah
Recorded and mixed in Unisound studio by Day DiSyraah May 1993
"Utsikt" recorded and mixed in Unisound studio by Day DiSyraah January 1993
Drawings and Khaooohs logo by Annah
Cover painting by Fritz Quasthoff
3d painting by Bo Lundstedt
Re-released by Osmose Productions in '01, along with "Dawn of Dreams"

External links
Encyclopaedia Metallum page

1993 albums
Pan.Thy.Monium albums
Swedish-language albums